Iglesia de San Francisco (Avilés) is a church in Asturias, Spain. It was once a Franciscan convent.

See also
Asturian art
Catholic Church in Spain
Churches in Asturias
List of oldest church buildings

References

Churches in Asturias